Salim Ghouse (10 January 1952 - 28 April 2022) was an Indian film, television and theatre actor, theatre director, and martial artist. He has acted in Hindi, Tamil, Telugu, Malayalam and English films.

Early life
Salim Ghouse was born in Chennai to a Muslim father and a Christian mother. He studied at the Christchurch School and the Presidency College in Chennai. He was also a graduate of the Film and Television Institute of India, Pune.

Career
Salim Ghouse is known for his role in the TV series Subah and for playing Rama, Krishna and Tipu Sultan in Shyam Benegal's TV Series Bharat Ek Khoj. He has also worked in TV serial Wagle Ki Duniya.

In 1989, he portrayed the villain in the Tamil film Vettri Vizhaa, directed by Pratap Pothen as the rival to Kamal Haasan. 
He starred alongside Mohanlal in the classic Malayalam movie Thazhvaram, directed by Bharathan. In 1993 he played the villain in Mani Ratnam's film Thiruda Thiruda. He acted alongside Madhuri Dixit and Shahrukh Khan in the 1997 film Koyla.

Filmography

Television

Dubbing roles

References

External links
 
 Salim Ghouse at Bollywood Hungama

1952 births
2022 deaths
Indian male film actors
Indian male stage actors
Indian male voice actors
Indian theatre directors
Tamil male actors
Film and Television Institute of India alumni
Presidency College, Chennai alumni
Male actors in Hindi cinema
Male actors in Malayalam cinema
21st-century Indian male actors
Male actors from Chennai